Jukeboxer is the moniker of the American, Brooklyn-based musician, Noah Wall. His music is put together digitally from recorded sounds, usually him playing an instrument. Many of his songs are the products of collaborations with other musicians. He has released two albums, a single and an EP.

Discography
Jukeboxer Learns the Alphabet CD, 2001
Man Throughout the Ages 12" EP, 2003
"Parenthetical" 7", 2003
Jukeboxer in the Food Chain CD, 2004

References

Living people
Year of birth missing (living people)
Memphis Industries artists